Maria Anna Veronese (died 1782) was a Franco/Italian actress active at the Comédie-Italienne in Paris. She became the mistress of Louis François Joseph, Prince of Conti, by whom she had two illegitimate children, born in 1761 and 1767.

Nicknamed "Mademoiselle Coraline", Anna Veronese was the daughter of Italian Pantalone-actor Carlo Veronese and the sister of actress Giacoma Antonia Veronese (d. 1768). She debuted with her sister at the Comédie-Italienne in Paris in 1744. The Veronese sisters are considered two of the most notable interpreters of the soubrette-parts of the commedia dell'arte. They were known as Corallina (Coraline in French) and Camilla, respectively, after their standard parts. Anna was particularly known for her quick costume changes.

References
 

1782 deaths
18th-century births
18th-century French actresses
French stage actresses
Actresses from Paris
18th-century Italian actresses
18th-century Italian women
Italian stage actresses
Commedia dell'arte
French people of Italian descent
House of Bourbon-Conti
Italian musicians
Year of birth missing